The Pak 43  (Panzerabwehrkanone 43 and Panzerjägerkanone 43) was a German 88 mm anti-tank gun developed  by Krupp in competition with the Rheinmetall 8.8 cm Flak 41 anti-aircraft gun and used during World War II. The Pak 43 was the most powerful anti-tank gun of the Wehrmacht to see service in significant numbers, also serving in modified form as the 8.8 cm KwK 43 main gun on the Tiger II tank, the open-top Nashorn and fully enclosed, casemate-hulled Elefant and Jagdpanther tank destroyers.

The improved 8.8 cm gun was fitted with a semi-automatic vertical breech mechanism that greatly reduced recoil. It could also be fired electrically while on its wheels. The gun had exceptional penetration and could defeat the frontal armour of any Allied tank to see service during the war at long range, even the Soviet IS-2 tanks and IS chassis-based tank destroyers. The gun's maximum firing range exceeded .

Design
KwK 43 and Pak 43s were initially manufactured with monobloc barrels but the extremely high muzzle velocity and operating pressures caused rapid barrel wear, resulting in a change to a two-piece barrel. This did not affect performance but made replacing a worn out barrel much faster and easier than before. A new PzGr.39/43 APCBC-HE projectile was designed, which, apart from the addition of much wider driving bands, was identical to the older  PzGr.39-1 APCBC-HE projectile used by the 8.8 cm KwK 36 and Pak 43 guns. The older PzGr.39-1 was used for the KwK & Pak 43 before new PzGr.39/43 rounds came into use but only if the gun had fired no more than 500 rounds. Over this, the expected barrel wear combined with the narrow driving bands could lead to a loss of pressure. The new PzGr.39/43 could be fired without loss of pressure until the barrel was worn out, thus requiring no restriction.

PzGr.39-1 FES & Al all up weight: 10.2 kg (9.87 kg without fuse & bursting charge)

PzGr.39/43 FES & Al all up weight: 10.4 kg (10.06 kg without fuse & bursting charge)

The same 278-gram BdZ 5127 fuse and 59-gram Amatol bursting charge was used for PzGr.39-1 and PzGr.39/43 rounds, requiring armoured targets of 30 mm or thicker to ignite after penetration for maximum effect.

Versions

The main version of the Pak 43 was based on a highly effective cruciform mount, which offered a full 360 degree traverse and a much lower profile than the ubiquitous anti-aircraft 8.8 cm Flak 37. However the manufacture of this version was initially slow and costly, a situation that was made worse by the destruction of the carriage production line by Allied bombing.

As part of the design effort from Krupp to compete with the Flak 41, a barrel had been produced to prove the ballistics and design. This barrel design was developed, via an intermediate design known as the Gerät 42, to become the barrel used with Pak 43/41 design. When the Pak 43 was delayed, Krupp was asked to produce a weapon using this barrel using as many existing components as possible. This previous barrel design was then designated the Pak 41.

The Pak 41 barrel was fitted with a horizontal sliding-block breech mechanism resembling that of the 7.5 cm Pak 40, and the semi-automatic gear was a simplified version of that used on the Pak 43. The two-wheel Split-trail carriage was from the 10.5 cm leFH 18 field howitzer, with the wheels from the 15 cm s FH howitzer. The Pak 41 was ballistically identical to the Pak 43 and fired the same ammunition, hence its performance was identical. Sources are unclear as to whether the Pak 41 and the Pak 43 barrels were identical; either way it is responsible for the Pak 43/41 designation for the whole design.

The 43/41 proved heavy and awkward to handle in the mud and snow of the Eastern Front and gunners referred to 43/41 as the "barn door", a reference to the size and weight of the gun. Nevertheless, the improvised Pak 43/41 proved an effective substitute for the Pak 43 until sufficient numbers of the more complex cruciform mounts could be manufactured to replace it in service.

The Pak 43 was also mounted in German armored vehicles, and this version was known as the 8.8 cm KwK 43.  Versions of this gun were mounted in a number of German armored vehicles under different designations,  including the Tiger II heavy tank (KwK 43 L/71) and several tank destroyers: the Hornisse/Nashorn (Pak 43/1), Ferdinand/Elefant (Pak 43/2, early name Stu.K. 43/1), and Jagdpanther (Pak 43/3 and Pak 43/4, early name Stu.K. 43). A few examples of the Tiger II-based Jagdtiger were also completed with the 8.8 cm weapon due to a shortage of the 12.8 cm Pak 44, but these tank destroyers are not believed to have seen operational service.

Service
There were 578 88mm Pak in German army service on 1 October 1944 and 829 on 1 January 1945.

Ammunition and penetration

The Pzgr. 39/43 and HE shells were generally available. Pzgr. 40/43  were in severely short supply.

Pzgr. 39/43 APCBC-HE
 Type: Armour Piercing Capped with Ballistic Cap - High Explosive
 Projectile weight: 10.4 kg (22.92 lbs)
 Muzzle velocity:

Pzgr. 40/43 APCR
 Type: Armour-piercing, Composite Rigid construction)
 Projectile weight: 7.3 kg (16 lbs)
 Muzzle velocity: 1,130 m/s (3,707 ft/s)

Gr. 39/3 HL (HEAT)
 Projectile weight: 7.65 kg (17 lbs)
 Muzzle velocity: 600 m/s (1,968 ft/s)
 Penetration: 110 mm

See also
 8.8 cm Flak 18/36/37/41
 90 mm gun M1/M2/M3
 Ordnance QF 32-pounder

Notes

References 
 Gander, Terry and Chamberlain, Peter. Weapons of the Third Reich: An Encyclopedic Survey of All Small Arms, Artillery and Special Weapons of the German Land Forces 1939–1945. New York: Doubleday, 1979 
 
 Hogg, Ian V. German Artillery of World War Two. 2nd corrected edition. Mechanicsville, PA: Stackpole Books, 1997 
 Wolfgang Fleischer. Die Deutsches Panzerjägertruppe Waffen, Munition und Fahrzeuge 1935–1945. — Eggolsheim: Dörfler im Nebel GmbH, 2003 .
 H.Dv. 119/329 ± Vorläufige Schußtafel für die 8,8 cm Kampfwagenkanone 43 (L/71) (8,8 cm Kw.K 43), 8,8 cm Panzerjägerkanone 43/1 (L/71) (8,8 cm Pak 43/1), 8,8 cm Panzerjägerkanone 43/2 (L/71) (8,8 cm Pak 43/2), 8,8 cm Panzerjägerkanone 43/3 (L/71) (8,8 cm Pak 43/3) und 8,8 cm Panzerjägerkanone 43/41 (L/71) (8,8 cm Pak 43/41), Juni 1943 mit eingearbeiteten Deckblättern Nr. 1 bis 9 (Ausgabe 1944).
 New Vanguard 46: 88mm Flak 18/36/37/41 & Pak 43 1936-45 (Osprey Publishing). Written by John Norris, illustrated by Mike Fuller.
 Bob Carruthers  "German Tank Hunters" Pen and Sword, 2013 , 
 Terry Gander "German 88: The Most Famous Gun of the Second World War" Pen and Sword, 2009 ,

External links

 8,8 cm Pak 43 (L/71) - Panzerworld
 8,8 cm Pak (album) - flickr
 D97/1+ Gerätliste 1943, p.45 - guns.ru

World War II anti-tank guns of Germany
88 mm artillery
Weapons and ammunition introduced in 1943